General Caballero is a neighbourhood of Asunción, Paraguay. 

General Caballero also may refer to:

 General Bernardino Caballero, Paraguay
 Club General Caballero (Juan León Mallorquín), a football club from Doctor Juan León Mallorquín, Paraguay
 General Caballero Sport Club, a football club from Zeballos Cué, Paraguay